A list of films produced in Spain in 1971 (see 1971 in film).

1971

Notes

References

External links
 Spanish films of 1971 at the Internet Movie Database

1971
Lists of 1971 films by country or language
Films